MS Gripsholm may refer to one of these passenger ships:
 , an ocean liner operated by the Swedish American Line, 1925–1954
 , a combined ocean liner/cruise ship operated by the Swedish American Line, 1957–1975
 MS Gripsholm (1965), a cruise ship operated by Transocean Tours 1996–1997

Ship names